Phraya Si Sitthisongkhram or birth name Din Tharap (10 May 1891–23 October 1933) was a Siamese career army officer. He became chief of staff of the First Army under the absolute monarchy, and was chief of operations of the army briefly during the post-1932 constitutional monarchy. He served as deputy commander of the royalist troops during the failed Boworadet Rebellion of 1933.

Biography
Din Tharab studied at a military academy in Imperial Germany where he was a classmate of Plaek Pibulsonggram. He received several royal titles, eventually becoming Phraya Sitthi Songkram. An outspoken royalist, on 11 October 1933, he joined Prince Boworadet in a rebellion to restore power to King Rama VII, who had surrendered it the previous year to the People's Party after its successful coup. Initially, the Rebellion positioned itself at Don Mueang and Bang Khen, on the northern outskirts of Bangkok. After a week-long fight, however, rebel forces were driven away from Bangkok. From then on, the government troops gained momentum and kept advancing on the rebellion's headquarters at Nakhon Ratchasima. On 23 October government troops charged Phraya Si SithiSongkram's defensive position. The battle was fierce, ending in bayonet fighting. Phraya Si SithiSongkram was shot and killed by Lieutenant Praphas Charusathien, who 40 years later would become one of the "three tyrants" deposed in the October 1973 uprising. The following day, Prince Boworadet fled to Saigon and the revolt ended.

Phraya Si SithiSongkram's daughter, Amphot Tharap, was the mother of General Surayud Chulanont, Commander of the Army and Prime Minister of Thailand following the successful army coup of 2006.

See also
 Boworadej
 Plaek Pibulsonggram
 History of Thailand (1932-1973)
 Prajadhipok
 Surayud Chulanont

Notes
1. Phraya is a Thai honorific, a title of ancient Thai civil nobility between พระ (Phra) and เจ้าพระยา  (Chao Phraya).

References

Further reading
 Thai Rath, เส้นทางจุลานนท์ ปฏิวัติ-กบฏ-นายก (Path of Chulanont Revolution-Rebellion-Premier), 5 October 2006
 เหตุเกิดในแผ่นดิน เล่ม 6 (Occurrences in the Land, volume 6)

Thai generals
Recipients of the Dushdi Mala Medal, Pin of Arts and Science
Assassinated Thai people
Deaths by firearm in Thailand
1891 births
1933 deaths
Phraya
Government ministers of Thailand